The women's 1500 metres event at the 2013 European Athletics Indoor Championships was held on March 1, 2013 at 19:05 (round 1), and March 2, 18:05 (final) local time.

Records

Results

Round 1
Qualification: First 2 (Q) or and the 3 fastest athletes (q) advanced to the final.

Final
The final was held at 18:05.

References

1500 metres at the European Athletics Indoor Championships
2013 European Athletics Indoor Championships
2013 in women's athletics